The Peregrine Corporation is an Australian privately owned company which operates the On The Run brand of service stations and convenience stores in South Australia, as well as the Smokemart & GiftBox tobacconists vape & variety retail stores nationwide.

It was founded by Fred Shahin in 1984 with the purchase of a BP service station in Woodville; and in 2020 it was listed at number 15 in the Australian Financial Review's "Top 500 Private Companies", with an estimated annual revenue of $2.6 billion. Peregrine bought the Mobil fuel outlets in South Australia in 2010 and 25 company-owned BP outlets in 2014. The acquired sites were rebranded and upgraded to 24-hour On the Run (OTR) convenience stores along with the service stations. The company owns The Bend Motorsport Park at Tailem Bend and the Mallala Motor Sport Park.

History
Fathi (Fred) Shahin and his Palestinian family moved to Lebanon during the 1948 Arab–Israeli War, when he was ten years old. Shahin went to night school to qualify as an accountant. After working for the United Nations for 27 years, he and his family migrated to Australia. 

When he could not find work, he bought a BP service station in the Adelaide suburb of Woodville, and the family lived on site. Peregrine was founded in 1984 with the purchase of the service station, soon followed by a chain of Smokemart (tobacco retailer) stores across Adelaide. 

After Fred's death, three of his sons, Yasser, Khalil (Charlie) and Samer (Sam) took over the business.

Peregrine bought the Mobil fuel outlets in South Australia in 2010 and 25 company-owned BP outlets in 2014. The acquired sites were rebranded and upgraded to 24-hour On The Run sites. 

By June 2014, Peregrine owned a chain of 24-hour convenience stores and service stations operating under the On The Run brand. Yasser Shahin and family were included on the BRW Rich 200 list in 2014.

In 2015 Peregrine announced plans to redevelop the former Mitsubishi Motors Australia test site outside Tailem Bend as The Bend Motorsport Park, that opened in 2017, and in May 2017, announced the purchase of the Mallala Motor Sport Park.

In 2020, Peregrine Corporation was listed at number nine in the Australian Financial Review's "Top 500 Private Companies", with an estimated annual revenue of $2.6 billion.

Company description

Peregrine Corporation owns and operates a diverse range of businesses.

Peregrine brought the Krispy Kreme doughnut franchise to South Australia and also runs the Mexican food franchise Guzman y Gomez.

As of September 2020, Peregrine was the 9th largest privately-owned company in Australia, and the largest in South Australia.

The Peregrine Corporation is South Australia’s largest private sector company and the state’s largest private sector employer, employing more than 4,500 employees across retail, marketing, human resources, property development, legal, business development and operations.

Controversies 

In 2018 the OTR brand of the company received significant criticism from consumers and environmental groups for a decision to ban reusable coffee cups, amongst growing concerns of the negative effect of the 1.2 billion disposable cups that end-up in landfill in Australia each year.

A class action on behalf of 1,050 On The Run workers was lodged with the Federal Court of Australia on 13 May 2020. The company was accused of failing to pay overtime, underpaying staff and misusing its traineeship program as a method to reduce workers' pay, dating back to 2014 and involving all stores in South Australia. OTR allegedly used eight different wage minimisation tactics that enabled gross underpayment of its staff. In March 2020, the Federal Court had upheld a separate decision by the South Australian Employment Tribunal to award $2,342 to an OTR employee who had been underpaid.

In 2020 there was opposition by local residents to a planned OTR outlet on Kensington Road in Kensington Park, and to the expansion of the Peregrine headquarters building in Kensington to a height of seven storeys with a helipad on top of the building.

In August 2020 Peregrine was ordered by the South Australian Employment Tribunal to pay $65,000 to an employee after being found to have deliberately underpaid him over the period of a year in 2016, at an OTR at Fulham.

References

Companies based in South Australia
Convenience stores
Family-owned companies of Australia
Retail companies established in 1984
1984 establishments in Australia
Smoking in Australia